Mark or Marc Hill may refer to:

 Marc Hill (born 1952), American Major League Baseball catcher
 Marc Lamont Hill (born 1978), American academic, journalist, author, activist and television personality
 Mark Hill (antiques expert) (born 1975), British antiques expert
 Mark Hill (cricketer) (born 1964), Australian cricketer
 Mark Hill (English footballer) (born 1961), English football player (Maidstone United)
 Mark Hill (musician) (born 1972), British recording artist, songwriter and record producer
 Mark Hill (Scottish footballer) (born 1998), Scottish football player (St Mirren)
 Mark Langdon Hill (1772–1842), United States Representative from Massachusetts and from Maine
Mark D. Hill, computer scientist

See also 
 Lord Marcus Hill (Marcus Sandys, 3rd Baron Sandys, 17981863), British politician
 Hill (surname)